Apollonius the Effeminate was a Greek rhetorician of Alabanda in Caria who flourished about 120 BC.

After studying under Menecles, chief of the Asiatic school of oratory, he settled in Rhodes, where he taught rhetoric. Among his pupils were Q. Mucius Scaevola the augur, and Marcus Antonius, the grandfather of Mark Antony.

References 

Ancient Greek rhetoricians
2nd-century BC Rhodians
Roman-era Rhodians